The Andreasen–Rossen House includes a two hundred acre historic district.

History
Designed by architect builder William S. Fitzell, the Andreasen–Rossen House was completed for Frands Wilhelm Andreasen in 1901. While called his "Skim Milk House" for Andreasen's thrifty habit of getting skim milk from other dairies to feed to his hogs, he also ran a successful creamery and dairy of his own.  In 1901, he and his family moved to Berkeley, California after he was appointed to the California State Dairy Bureau.

In 1901, Andreasen sold the house to the Rossen family who lived there until 1988. New owners repaired and refinished original woodwork and rewired all the original fixtures; for a time opening it for tours to the public. The house was added to the National Register of Historic Places on 25 September 1989.  Since 1991, it has again been a private residence.

References

External links
 
 

Victorian architecture in California
Queen Anne architecture in California
Houses on the National Register of Historic Places in California
Buildings and structures in Ferndale, California
Houses in Humboldt County, California
National Register of Historic Places in Humboldt County, California
1901 establishments in California
Houses completed in 1901